Unguturu may refer to:

 Unguturu, Guntur district, a village in Guntur district, Andhra Pradesh, India
 Unguturu, Krishna district, a village in Krishna district, Andhra Pradesh, India
 Unguturu, West Godavari district, a village in West Godavari district, Andhra Pradesh, India
 Unguturu (Assembly constituency), one of 14 constituencies from West Godavari district in the Andhra Pradesh Legislative Assembly in India